This is a list of notable manga series that appeared in The New York Times Manga Best Seller lists in 2012.

References

2012 in comics
2012
Lists of manga